Edsel Martis (born December 22, 1961 in Veeris, Curacao) is a Dutch baseball player who played in the Dutch Major League (1982-1997 / 2006-2007) for Amsterdam Pirates, Hoofddorp Pioniers and HCAW Bussum. Known for his ability to hit for power and contact from the lefty side and his athletic ability and speed. 

His accolades in the Dutch Major League consists of:

Dutch Major League Champion, Batting title winner, Homerun Leader, Most RBI’s and Most stolen bases.
He represented the Netherlands at the 1996 Summer Olympics.  

Martis was born in Willemstad, Curacao. He is married and has two Sons: Sergino Martis and Jermin Martis. He owns his own Transport Company: Edmar Transport in the Netherlands.

References

1961 births
Baseball players at the 1996 Summer Olympics
Curaçao baseball players
Dutch people of Curaçao descent
Living people
Olympic baseball players of the Netherlands
Dutch baseball players
People from Willemstad